Trechus aethiopicus is a species of ground beetle in the subfamily Trechinae. It was described by Alluaud in 1918.

References

aethiopicus
Beetles described in 1918